Nasimuddin Siddiqui (born 4 June 1959) is an Uttar Pradesh politician and a member of Indian National Congress, formerly a prominent member of Bahujan Samaj Party. He was expelled by BSP chief Mayawati on 10 May 2017. He became a MLA in Uttar Pradesh Legislative Assembly in 1991. Later he was made a cabinet minister in Mayawati government. 
He joined Indian National Congress on 22 February at congress office, New Delhi with more than 35000 of his supporters and With Several Mp's And MLA's of Uttar Pradesh.

References

Date of birth missing (living people)
Living people
Muslim politics in India
Uttar Pradesh MLAs 2007–2012
Uttar Pradesh MLAs 1991–1993
People from Banda district, India
Bahujan Samaj Party politicians from Uttar Pradesh
1959 births
Indian National Congress politicians from Uttar Pradesh